Alan George may refer to:

 J. Alan George (born 1943), computer scientist and university administrator at the University of Waterloo
 Alan Dale George,  computer scientist at the University of Florida